Bobbed Hair is a 1922 American romance film directed by Thomas N. Heffron and written by Harvey F. Thew. The film stars Wanda Hawley, William Boyd, Adele Farrington, Leigh Wyant, Jane Starr, and Margaret Vilmore. The film was released on March 12, 1922, by Famous Players-Lasky Corporation.

Plot
As described in a film magazine, Polly Heath (Hawley), a romantic young woman, runs away from home when her approved suitor, Dick Barton (Boyd), dwells too consistently upon material considerations like money and diamonds. She takes up abode with an old school chum in a new thought colony and bobs her hair and dons Grecian vestments. Her suitor follows her and rescues her from ultra modern poet Paul Lamont (Carleton) who has engineered a compromising situation, whereupon she sees his proffered solitaire in a new light and forswears romance and futurism indefinitely.

Cast   
Wanda Hawley as Polly Heath
William Boyd as Dick Barton
Adele Farrington as Aunt Emily
Leigh Wyant as Zoe Dean
Jane Starr as Evelyn
Margaret Vilmore as Daisy
William P. Carleton as Paul Lamont
Ethel Wales as Mrs. Lamont
Junior Coghlan as Lamont Child 
Robert Kelly as Lamont Child

References

External links

 

1922 films
American romance films
1920s romance films
Films directed by Thomas N. Heffron
American silent feature films
American black-and-white films
1920s English-language films
1920s American films